Mesorhizobium ciceri is a gram-negative, nitrogen-fixing motile bacteria from the genus of Mesorhizobium which was isolated from Chickpea nodules of Cicer arietinum in Spain.  Rhizobium cicero was transferred to Mesorhizobium ciceri.

References

Further reading

External links
Type strain of Mesorhizobium ciceri at BacDive -  the Bacterial Diversity Metadatabase

Phyllobacteriaceae
Bacteria described in 1997